The 2007 Indianapolis City–County Council elections took place on November 6, 2007. All 29 seats were up for re-election, 25 districts and 4 at-large seats, on the Indianapolis City–County Council. Seven of the seats were unopposed, 4 held by Democrats and 3 held by Republicans. Prior to the elections Democrats held a 15-14-seat majority. Following the elections Republicans gained control of the council with a 16-13 majority.

The Indianapolis mayoral election took place alongside the council elections.

Results by district
The following are the final results from the Marion County Clerk, Beth White.

References

Indianapolis 
Elections 2007
Indianapolis 2007
Indianapolis City-County Council